This is a list of rivers in the U.S. state of Wisconsin.

By drainage basin
This list is arranged by drainage basin, with respective tributaries indented under each larger stream's name.

Great Lakes Drainage

Lake Michigan 

Menominee River
Wausaukee River
Pike River
Pemebonwon River
Little Popple River
Pine River
Popple River
Brule River
Peshtigo River
Little Peshtigo River
Thunder River
Rat River 
Indian River
Oconto River
Little River
Pensaukee River
Little Suamico River
Suamico River
Potter Creek

Fox River
East River
Fond du Lac River
Wolf River
Pine River
Rat River
Waupaca River
Crystal River
Tomorrow River
Little Wolf River
Embarrass River
Pigeon River
Shioc River
Red River
Evergreen River
Lily River
Hunting River
White River
Mecan River
Grand River
Montello River
Red River
Mink River
Ahnapee River
Kewaunee River
East Twin River
West Twin River
Devils River
Neshota River
Little Manitowoc River

Manitowoc River
Branch River
Killsnake River
Pigeon River
Meeme River
Sheboygan River
Onion River
Mullet River
Black River
Milwaukee River
Kinnickinnic River
Menomonee River
Little Menomonee River
Ulao Creek
Cedar Creek
Root River
Pike River
Barnes Creek

Lake Superior 
Presque Isle River
Black River
Montreal River
West Branch Montreal River
Bad River
White River
Potato River
Marengo River
Brunsweiler River
Tyler Forks
Iron River
Kakagon River
Fish Creek
Boyd Creek
Whittlesey Creek
Bono Creek
Sioux River
Little Sioux River
Onion River
Raspberry River
Sand River
Siskiwit River
Bark River
Cranberry River
Flag River
Iron River
Bois Brule River
Little Bois Brule River
Poplar River
Middle River
Amnicon River
Little Amnicon River
Nemadji River
Black River
St. Louis River
Pokegama River
Little Pokegama River
Red River

Mississippi River Drainage 
Mississippi River
Illinois River (IL)
Fox River
White River
Mukwonago River
Des Plaines River
Root River
Rock River
Kishwaukee River (IL)
Piscasaw Creek
Pecatonica River
Sugar River
Little Sugar River
West Branch Sugar River
East Branch Pecatonica River
Yellowstone River
Yahara River
Bark River
Scuppernong River
Crawfish River
Beaver Dam River
Calamus Creek
Maunesha River
Johnson Creek
Oconomowoc River
Coney River
Ashippun River
Rubicon River
East Branch Rock River
Kohlsville River
Apple River
Galena River
Sinsinawa River
Little Menominee River
Menominee River
Platte River
Little Platte River
Grant River
Little Grant River
Wisconsin River
Kickapoo River
Weister Creek
Big Green River
Little Green River
Blue River
Pine River
Otter Creek
Flint Creek
Harker Creek
Baraboo River
Dell Creek
Lemonweir River
Little Lemonweir River
Yellow River
Little Yellow River
Plover River
Little Eau Claire River
Little Eau Pleine River
Big Eau Pleine River
Eau Claire River
Big Rib River
Little Rib River
Trappe River
Little Trappe River
Pine River
Prairie River
Copper River
New Wood River
Spirit River
Somo River
Little Somo River
Tomahawk River
Little Rice River
Willow River
Squirrel River
Pelican River
Eagle River
Deerskin River
Leitner Creek
Bad Axe River
La Crosse River
Little La Crosse River
Black River
Popple River
Little Black River
Trempealeau River
Buffalo River
Chippewa River
Eau Galle River
Red Cedar River
Hay River
Chetek River
Yellow River
Vermillion River
Sweeny Pond
Brill River
Eau Claire River
Wolf River
Yellow River
Jump River
Little Jump River
Mondeaux River
Flambeau River
North Fork Flambeau River
Swamp Creek
South Fork Flambeau River
Elk River
Little Elk River
Turtle River
Little Turtle River
Bear River
Manitowish River
Trout River
Thornapple River
Little Thornapple River
Brunet River
Couderay River
North Fork Chief River
Teal River
Token Creek
Moose River
Rush River
Trimbelle River
Wind River
Big River
St. Croix River
Kinnickinnic River
Willow River
Apple River
Straight River
Trade River
Wood River
Clam River
Yellow River
Upper Tamarack River
Spruce River
Namekagon River
Totagatic River
Ounce River
Moose River 
Eau Claire River

Alphabetically 
Ahnapee River
Amnicon River
Apple River (Illinois), tributary of Mississippi River
Apple River (Wisconsin), tributary of St. Croix River
Ashippun River
Bad Axe River
Bad River 
Baraboo River
Bark River (Lake Superior)
Bark River (Rock River tributary)
Barnes Creek 
Bear River 
Beaver Dam River
Big Eau Pleine River
Big Green River
Big Rib River
Big River
Black River (Gogebic County), tributary of Lake Superior via upper Michigan
Black River (Mississippi River tributary)
Black River (Nemadji River tributary)
Black River (Wisconsin–Lake Michigan), tributary of Lake Michigan
Blue River
Bois Brule River
Bono Creek
Boyd Creek 
Branch River 
Brill River
Brule River
Brunet River
Brunsweiler River
Buffalo River 
Calamus Creek 
Cedar Creek 
Chetek River
Chief River
Chippewa River 
Clam River 
Coney River
Copper River
Couderay River
Cranberry River 
Crawfish River
Crystal River 
Deerskin River
Dell Creek
Des Plaines River
Devils River
Eagle River
East Branch Pecatonica River
East River 
East Twin River 
Eau Claire River (Chippewa River tributary)
Eau Claire River (St. Croix River tributary)
Eau Claire River (Wisconsin River tributary)
Eau Galle River
Elk River 
Embarrass River
Evergreen River
Fisher River 
Flag River
Flambeau River
Flint Creek 
Fond du Lac River 
Fox River (Illinois River tributary)
Fox River (Wisconsin), tributary of Green Bay
Galena River 
Grand River 
Grant River
Harker Creek 
Hay River
Indian River 
Iron River (Bad River tributary)
Iron River (Lake Superior)
Johnson Creek 
Jump River
Kakagon River
Kewaunee River
Kickapoo River
Killsnake River
Kinnickinnic River (Milwaukee River tributary)
Kinnickinnic River (St. Croix River tributary)
Kohlsville River
La Crosse River
Leitner Creek
Lemonweir River
Lily River
Little Amnicon River
Little Black River 
Little Boise Brule River
Little Deerskin River
Little Eau Claire River
Little Eau Pleine River
Little Elk River
Little Grant River
Little Green River 
Little Jump River
Little Lemonweir River
Little Manitowoc River
Little Menominee River
Little Menomonee River
Little Moose River
Little Oconomowoc River
Little Peshtigo River
Little Platte River
Little Plover River
Little Pokegama River
Little Popple River
Little Rib River
Little Rice River
Little River (Oconto River tributary)
Little Sioux River
Little Somo River
Little Suamico River
Little Sugar River 
Little Thornapple River
Little Trappe River
Little Turtle River 
Little Wolf River
Little Yellow River 
Manitowish River
Manitowoc River
Marengo River
Maunesha River
Mecan River
Meeme River
Menominee River, tributary of Lake Michigan
Menominee River (Illinois), tributary of Mississippi River
Menomonee River, tributary of Milwaukee River
Middle River 
Milwaukee River
Mink River
Mississippi River
Mondeaux River
Montello River
Montreal River 
Moose River (Chippewa River tributary)
Moose River (St. Croix River tributary)
Mukwonago River
Mullet River
Namekagon River
Nemadji River
Neshota River
New Wood River
North Fork Chief River
Oconomowoc River
Oconto River
Onion River (Lake Superior)
Onion River (Sheboygan River tributary)
Otter Creek 
Ounce River
Pecatonica River
Pelican River (Wisconsin River tributary)
Pemebonwon River
Pensaukee River
Peshtigo River
Pewaukee River
Pigeon River (Embarrass River tributary)
Pigeon River (Wisconsin-Lake Michigan), tributary of Lake Michigan
Pike River (Lake Michigan)
Pike River (Menominee River tributary)
Pine River (Florence County), tributary of Menominee River
Pine River (Lincoln County), tributary of Wisconsin River
Pine River (Richland County), tributary of Wisconsin River
Pine River (Waushara County), tributary of Wolf River
Piscasaw Creek
Platte River 
Plover River
Pokegama River
Poplar River 
Popple River (Black River tributary)
Popple River (Pine River tributary)
Potato River
Potter Creek
Prairie River 
Presque Isle River
Raspberry River
Rat River (Peshtigo River tributary)
Rat River (Wolf River tributary)
Red Cedar River 
Red River (Lake Michigan)
Red River (St. Louis River tributary)
Red River (Wolf River tributary)
Rock River 
Root River (Des Plaines River tributary)
Root River
Rubicon River
Rush River 
St. Croix River 
St. Germain River
St. Louis River
Sand River 
Scuppernong River 
Sheboygan River
Shioc River
Sinsinawa River
Sioux River 
Siskiwit River 
Somo River
Spirit River
Spruce River 
Squirrel River 
Straight River 
Suamico River
Sugar River 
Sweeny Pond River
Teal River
Thornapple River
Thunder River (Peshtigo River tributary)
Tomahawk River
Tomorrow River
Torch River
Totagatic River
Trade River
Trappe River
Trempealeau River
Trimbelle River
Trout River 
Turtle River 
Ulao Creek
Upper Tamarack River
Vermillion River 
Waupaca River
Wausaukee River
Weister Creek
West Branch Montreal River
West Branch Sugar River
West Twin River 
White River (Bad River tributary)
White River (Fox River tributary)
Whittlesey Creek
Willow River (St. Croix River tributary)
Willow River (Tomahawk River tributary)
Wind River
Wisconsin River
Wolf River (Eau Claire River tributary)
Wolf River (Fox River tributary), tributary of Winnebago Pool
Wood River 
Yahara River
Yellow River (Chippewa River tributary)
Yellow River (Red Cedar River tributary)
Yellow River (St. Croix River tributary)
Yellow River (Wisconsin River tributary)
Yellowstone River

See also

List of rivers in the United States

References
USGS Geographic Names Information System
USGS Hydrologic Unit Map - State of Wisconsin (1974)
Wisconsin Watersheds & basins

Wisconsin rivers
 
Rivers